Sulbenicillin (INN) is a penicillin antibiotic.It has been used in combination with dibekacin.

References

Penicillins